Walls of Prejudice is a 1920 British silent drama film directed by Charles Calvert and starring Josephine Earle, Dallas Anderson and Humberston Wright. It was based on a play by Alexander Grossman.

Cast
 Josephine Earle as Margaret Benson 
 Dallas Anderson as Patrick Benson 
 Humberston Wright as Bigton 
 Zoe Palmer as Madge Benson 
 Cyril Smith as Karpat

References

Bibliography
 Bamford, Kenton. Distorted Images: British National Identity and Film in the 1920s. I.B. Tauris, 1999.

External links

1920 films
British drama films
Films directed by Charles Calvert
British silent feature films
British black-and-white films
1920 drama films
1920s English-language films
1920s British films
Silent drama films